The HTC Apache is a Windows Mobile 5.0 device, sold as the PPC-6700 by Sprint, and the XV6700 by Verizon Wireless and other US carriers. The device was one of the first CDMA Windows Mobile 5.0 devices on the market, and the first to be released in the United States. The Apache is a Pocket PC PDA with smartphone capabilities.

The upgraded generation of the model is the HTC Mogul, also known as the HTC Titan, the PPC-6800, or the XV6800 from Verizon Wireless.

Features
 CDMA 1xRTT/EVDO
 Bluetooth
 802.11b Wi-Fi
 1.3 Megapixel camera/camcorder
 Built in QWERTY slide out keyboard (but no hardware ctrl key)
 Blue LED keyboard backlight
 2.88" 64K color TFT touchscreen
 Speakerphone
 USB and infrared dial up networking
 MiniSD / MMC card slot
Reference: Section  5.4 of the Verizon XV6700 User Manual (expansion slot compatible with miniSD and MMC cards)

Specifications
Band: CDMA 800/1900
Weight: 6.07 oz
Dimensions: 4.25" x 2.32" x 0.93"
Battery Type: Lithium Ion polymer 1350 mAh
Display Resolution: 240x320 16-bit QVGA
Java: Yes, MIDP: 2.0
Built in memory: 128 MB (Flash memory), 64 MB Ram
Operating system: Windows Mobile 5.0 for Pocket PC Phone Edition

Due to the popularity of the device there are many unofficial Operating System releases found on the Internet. Most notably, Windows Mobile 6.5 Professional.

External links 
Manufacturer's site
Product page 
Microsoft Windows Mobile
Custom Rom enthusiasts
HTC Custom Rom kitchen
AIG Investments support page for default firmware and documentation on the PPC6700 and XV6700
UT Starcom support link for Verizon Wireless - Deprecated
UT Starcom support link for Sprint - deprecated
Running Linux on the HTC Apache phone
Chinese xv6700 website

Apache
Windows Mobile Professional devices
Mobile phones with an integrated hardware keyboard